Karl Theodor Richard Lessing (8 February 1872, Hanover – 31 August 1933, Marienbad) was a German Jewish philosopher.

He is known for opposing the rise of Hindenburg as president of the Weimar Republic and for his classic on Jewish self-hatred (Der jüdische Selbsthaß), a book which he wrote in 1930, three years before Adolf Hitler came to power, in which he tried to explain the phenomenon of Jewish intellectuals who incited antisemitism against the Jewish people and who regarded Judaism as the source of evil in the world.

Lessing's political ideals, as well as his Zionism made him a very controversial person during the rise of Nazi Germany. He fled to Czechoslovakia where he lived in Marienbad in the villa of a local social democratic politician. On the night of 30 August 1933, he was assassinated by Sudeten German Nazi sympathizers. Lessing was shot through a window of the villa where he lived. His assassins were German Nazis from Sudetenland, Rudolf Max Eckert, Rudolf Zischka and Karl Hönl. They fled to Nazi Germany after the assassination.

Lessing's philosophical views were influenced by Nietzsche and Afrikan Spir. According to Theodore Ziolkowski in Lessing's Geschichte als Sinngebung des Sinnlosen (History as Giving Meaning to the Meaningless), "writing in the tradition of Nietzsche, argued that history, having no objective validity, amounts to a mythic construct imposed on an unknowable reality, in order to give it some semblance of meaning."

Life

Early life
Lessing was born into an upper-middle-class assimilated Jewish family. His father was a doctor in Hanover, his mother the daughter of a banker. He remembered his schooldays as unhappy; he was a mediocre student and graduated from Ratsgymnasium Hannover only with great difficulty. In his memoirs he wrote: "This humanistic German gymnasium specialising in patriotism, Latin, and Greek... this institute for the furtherance of stupidification, half of it built on white-collar boundering, the other half on mendacious, platitudinous German nationalism, was not just incredibly irresponsible, it was utterly boring... Nothing, nothing could ever make up for what those fifteen years destroyed in me. Even now, almost every night I dream of the tortures of my schooldays." At the time he was friendly with Ludwig Klages, but this friendship came to an end in 1899 (although whether anti-Semitism was a factor is unclear). Each later maintained that his own adult views had been determined by this shared background.

After his graduation he began studying medicine in Freiburg im Breisgau, Bonn, and finally Munich, where, in greater conformity with his real interests, he turned to literature, philosophy, and psychology. He concluded his study of philosophy with a dissertation on the work of the Russian logician Afrikan Spir.

His plans of habilitation at the University of Dresden were abandoned in the face of continuing public outrage over the influence in academia of Jews, socialists, and feminists. The next few years he spent as a substitute teacher and lecturer. In 1906 he travelled to Göttingen in order to obtain a habilitation under Edmund Husserl. This plan also came to nothing, but resulted briefly in a position as theatre critic for the Göttinger Zeitung; his critical notes were later collected in book form as Nachtkritiken.

Growing renown
In 1907 he returned to Hanover, where he lectured on philosophy at the Technische Hochschule, founding the first German anti-noise (noise abatement) society.

In January 1910 he created a literary scandal with a vicious attack on the critic Samuel Lublinski and his Bilanz der Moderne (1904), in a piece published in Die Schaubühne filled with "Jewish jokes" and gibes about Lublinski's appearance; it drew strong condemnation from Thomas Mann, who returned the insults by calling Lessing a "disgraceful dwarf who should consider himself lucky that the sun shines on him, too."

On the outbreak of World War I Lessing volunteered for medical service. At this time he wrote his famous essay Geschichte als Sinngebung des Sinnlosen ("History as Making Sense of the Senseless"). Its publication was delayed by the censor until 1919 on account of its uncompromising anti-war position. After the war he returned to lecturing in Hanover and established the Volkshochschule Hannover-Linden with the help of his second wife, Ada Lessing.

Fame and anti-nationalist polemics
From 1923 he was highly active in public life, publishing articles and essays in Prager Tagblatt and Dortmunder Generalanzeiger, and quickly became one of the best-known political writers of Weimar Germany. In 1925 he drew attention to the fact that the serial killer Fritz Haarmann had been a spy for the Hanover police, and this resulted in him being excluded from covering the trial. In the same year he wrote an unflattering piece on Paul von Hindenburg, describing him as an intellectually vacuous man who was being used as a front by sinister political forces:

It was Plato's view that the leaders of men should be philosophers. No philosopher ascends the throne in Hindenburg. Only a representative symbol, a question mark, a zero. One might say "Better a zero than a Nero." Sadly, history shows that behind every zero lurks a future Nero.

This article earned him the enmity of nationalists, and his lectures were soon disrupted by anti-Semitic protestors. Lessing received only limited support from the public, and even his colleagues argued that he had gone too far. A six-month leave of absence failed to calm the situation. On 7 June nearly a thousand students threatened to move their studies to the Technische Universität Braunschweig unless he was removed, and on 18 June 1926 the Prussian minister Carl Heinrich Becker bowed to public pressure by putting Lessing on indefinite leave on a reduced salary.

Escape from the Nazis and assassination

On 30 January 1933 the Nazi Party entered government and in February, after the suppression of the Das Freie Wort congress, Lessing started packing his bags. On 1 March he and his wife fled to Marienbad in Czechoslovakia, where he continued to write for German-language newspapers abroad. But in June it was reported in Sudeten newspapers that a reward had been announced for his capture.

On 30 August 1933 he was working in his study on the first floor at the Villa Edelweiss (today at Třebízského 33) when he was shot through the window by assassins. He died the next day at the hospital in Marienbad.

Literary works / editions 
 African Spirs Erkenntnislehre, Gießen, Münchow, 1900  Lessing's dissertation at Erlangen.
 Geschichte als Sinngebung des Sinnlosen. (Beck) 1919    bzw. Leipzig: Reinicke Verlag 1927 . Neu: München: Matthes & Seitz 1983.  
 Haarmann. Die Geschichte eines Werwolfs. 1925
 Meine Tiere. 1926
 Blumen. 1928
 Der jüdische Selbsthaß. 1930  Jewish Self-Hate, translated and annotated by Peter C. Applebaum, Introduction by Sander L. Gilman, Afterword by Paul Reitter, Edited by Benton Arnovitz. Berghahn Books 2021. 
 Einmal und nie wieder. Erinnerungen, aus dem Nachlass herausgegeben 1935
 Die verfluchte Kultur. Matthes & Seitz 1981. 
 Jörg Wollenberg (Hrsg.): Theodor Lessing – Ausgewählte Schriften. Donat Verlag Bremen
 Band 1: Theodor Lessing: 'Bildung ist Schönheit' – Autobiographische Zeugnisse und Schriften zur Bildungsreform. Bremen 1995
 Band 2: Theodor Lessing: 'Wir machen nicht mit!' – Schriften gegen den Nationalismus und zur Judenfrage. Bremen 1997
 Band 3: Theodor Lessing: 'Theaterseele' und 'Tomi melkt die Moralkuh' – Schriften zu Theater und Literatur. Bremen 2003
 "Geschichte als Sinngebung des Sinnlosen". Zum Leben und Werk des Kulturkritikers Theodor Lessing (1872-1933), hrsg. von Elke-Vera Kotowski, Hildesheim 2006

See also 
Munich phenomenology

Notes

References 
 August Messer, Der Fall Lessing, eine objektive Darstellung und kritische Würdigung, Bielefeld 1926
 Ekkehard Hieronimus, Theodor Lessing, Otto Meyerhof, Leonard Nelson. Bedeutende Juden in Niedersachsen, hrsg. von der Niedersächsischen Landeszentrale für Politische Bildung, Hannover 1964
 Lawrence Baron, Theodor Lessing: Between Jewish Self-Hatred and Zionism, in: Year Book XXVI Leo Baeck Inst. 1981
 Ich warf eine Flaschenpost ins Eismeer der Geschichte. Sammelband mit Essays und Feuilletons, herausgegeben und eingeleitet von R. Marwedel, Luchterhand Literaturverlag, Frankfurt am Main 1986
 Rainer Marwedel: Theodor Lessing 1872-1933. Eine Biographie. Luchterhand Verlag, Frankfurt am Main 1987
 Michael Kühntopf-Gentz, Der im Judentum ignorierte Gott: Theodor Lessings religiöse Philosophie, in: Zeitschrift für Religions- und Geistesgeschichte (ZRGG), Jahrgang 41, 1989
 Helmut Heiber: Universität unterm Hakenkreuz. Teil 1: Der Professor im Dritten Reich. Bilder aus der akademischen Provinz. K.G. Saur, München 1991, S. 54–67, Anm. 514, S. 186ff.
 Maja I. Siegrist: Theodor Lessing – Die entropische Philosophie – Freilegung und Rekonstruktion eines verdrängten Denkers. Peter Lang Verlag, Bern 1995
 Julius H. Schoeps: Der ungeliebte Außenseiter. Zum Leben und Werk des Philosophen und Schriftstellers Th. L., in: Der Exodus aus Nazideutschland und die Folgen. Jüdische Wissenschaftler im Exil Hg. Marianne Hassler, Attempto, Tübingen 1997, 
 Elke-Vera Kotowski: Feindliche Dioskuren – Theodor Lessing und Ludwig Klages – Das Scheitern einer Freundschaft. Jüdische Verlagsanstalt, Berlin 2000
 Lessing und Ludwig Klages – Das Scheitern einer Freundschaft,  Jüdische Verlagsanstalt, Berlin 2000
 "Ich warf eine Flaschenpost in das unermessliche Dunkel". Theodor Lessing 1872-1933'', hrsg. von Elke-Vera Kotowski (Katalog zur gleichnamigen Wanderausstellung), Hildesheim 2008

External links

 
 Hindenburg (1925)
 Über den Mord an Lessing*
 Personality of the Week – Lessing at www.bh.org.il
 Der jüdische Selbsthaß, Berlin 1930, Jüdischer Verlag, Theodor Lessing on the Internet Archive.
 English translation of Lessing's essay on "Otto Weininger" at Internet Archive.
 

1872 births
1933 deaths
19th-century German male writers
19th-century German writers
19th-century German philosophers
20th-century German male writers
20th-century German philosophers
Anti-nationalism in Europe
Assassinated German people
Assassinated Jews
Deaths by firearm in Czechoslovakia
German people murdered abroad
German Zionists
Jewish emigrants from Nazi Germany
Jewish philosophers
People from the Province of Hanover
People murdered in Czechoslovakia
Writers from Hanover